Hightower is a surname. 

Hightower may also refer to:

 Hightower (band), a French punk rock band
 Hightower, Texas, United States, an unincorporated community
 Hightower Building, a commercial office building in Oklahoma City, Oklahoma, United States, on the National Register of Historic Places
 Hightower Falls, a waterfall and historic site in Cedartown, Georgia
 Hightower Forest, a state forest in Dawson County, Georgia, United States
 Hightower High School, Missouri City, Texas
 Hightower Park, a small park in Oklahoma City, Oklahoma
 Battle of Hightower, a 1793 battle of the Cherokee–American wars
 Hightower Text, a serif typeface

See also
 
 High Tower, a 2014 Swedish children's radio programme
 "The High Tower", a first season episode of Star Wars Resistance